Daniel Tom George (born September 1, 1984), known professionally as DenG, is a Liberian singer and songwriter from Bong County. He started his music career as an R&B artist before making a guest appearance on Emma Smith's single "I Want to Go". DenG rose to prominence after being featured on Queen V's 2013 hit single "Jue You Bad". Following the success of "Jue You Bad", he switched from R&B to Afro pop.

Music career
A descendant of the Kpelle tribe, Daniel Tom George was born on September 1, 1984, in Bong County, Liberia. He developed an interest in music at a young age and joined his church's choir. DenG's family relocated to Ghana during Liberia's second civil war; he attended Achimota School while living in Ghana. DenG returned to Liberia and studied business at the United Methodist University. He started his music career as an R&B artist before venturing into Afro pop music, and was featured on Emma Smith's single "I Want to Go". DenG gained prominence in 2013 after being featured on Queen V's hit single "Jue You Bad", which also features vocals by Tan Tan. In 2014, he released the single "They Vex", a song that addresses the jealousy associated with fame and recognition. His management team announced a tee-shirt collection, featuring the phrase "If they vex, let them buss", would arrive in Liberia. DenG collaborated with F.A and Soul Fresh to record "Ebola is Real", a hipco track that informs Liberians about ways they can protect and prevent the spread of Ebola. Recorded in colloquial English, "Ebola is Real" was created in partnership with Liberia's Ministry of Health & Social Welfare and the radio station Hott FM. 

In 2015, DenG won Artist of the Year and Song of the Year for "They Vex" at the 2015 Liberia Music Awards. He also won Best Artist and Song of the Year for "They Vex" at the 2015 Liberian Entertainment Awards. DenG signed a $50,000 endorsement deal with Novafone Liberia, a GSM carrier. He released "Kemah" in 2015; it earned him a nomination for Best New Artist at the African Entertainment Awards that same year. In January 2016, DenG posted a note on his Facebook page, expressing his desire to quit music. However, in a telephone interview with LIB Life, he clarified his post was intended to find out whether Liberians still had interest in his career. 

The music video for DenG's "Put Foot" was released in January 2016. DenG first announced plans for the video's release earlier that month. He accused his manager Alice Yawo of downgrading the video's quality after she thanked a fan, who belittled the video, for their comments. In June 2016, DenG and Yawo had a fallout from their unwillingness to communicate. DenG was nominated for Listener's Choice at the 2016 MTV Africa Music Awards, becoming the first Liberian artist to receive a MAMA nomination. In late 2016, he performed alongside Christoph the Change, Kcee and Tekno at Beach Jam, a concert sponsored by Lonestar Cell. On June 9, 2017, DenG released the Sarkodie-assisted track "Janjay". It was jointly produced by Liberia's Stone Luckshine and Ghana's Possigee. Described as a Liberian highlife song, "Janjay" contains lyrics about a girl's dream. Prior to the song's release, DenG enlisted Kcee to appear on his track "Make Dem Talk". In July 2017, Emma Smith recruited DenG to lent vocals to her single "Hold Ground", an up-tempo track that has elements of Afrobeat and dancehall.  

In May 2018, DenG organized the first leg of his American tour; it concluded with a concert in Washington DC. In August 2018, he performed at the One Africa Music Fest, becoming the first Liberian act to perform at the festival. Held at the Ford Amphitheater at Coney Island, the festival featured additional performances from Wizkid, Flavour N'abania, Tekno, Sarkodie, Cassper Nyovest and Diamond Platnumz. DenG was one of the Liberian acts who performed at a concert headlined by Nigerian singer Davido; the concert was held at the Samuel Kanyon Doe Sports Complex in November 2018.

In 2020, DenG collaborated with Takun J, Sundaygar Dearboy, Tan Tan, Soul Smiter, Odemz, and Amaze to produce the hipco song "Sanitize". The artists released the song in order to raise awareness about Covid-19 and encourage Liberians to practice good hygiene.

Personal life
In January 2018, The New Dawn newspaper reported that DenG's brother Smith George died in Margibi County. George's body was discovered with foam around the mouth.

Awards and nominations

See also
List of Liberian musicians

References

1984 births
Living people
Liberian singers
Liberian songwriters
People from Bong County
Alumni of Achimota School
United Methodist University alumni
Liberian people of Kpelle descent